William Thomas Pine  was an American politician who served as Mayor of Marlborough, Massachusetts.

Notes

Mayors of Marlborough, Massachusetts
1873 births
Year of death missing